Gentry's Mill is an unincorporated community in Hamilton County, in the U.S. state of Texas. According to the Handbook of Texas, the community had a population of 17 in 2000.

History
Gentry's Mill was named for Frederick Browder Gentry. He settled in this area in 1875 on Waring Creek and owned a wheat and corn mill. S.C. Terry then built a gin. A post office was established at Gentry's Mill in 1876 and remained in operation until 1895. Its population was 75 in 1884. The 1983 county highway map showed a church, cemetery, and community center in the community. Its population was 17 in 2000.

Geography

Education
Gentry's Mill had a school until 1950. Today the community is served by the Hamilton Independent School District.

References

Unincorporated communities in Hamilton County, Texas
Unincorporated communities in Texas